The Hawk in the Rain is a collection of 40 poems by the British poet Ted Hughes.  Published by Faber and Faber in 1957, it was Hughes's first book of poetry. The book received immediate acclaim in both England and America, where it won the Galbraith Prize. Many of the book's poems imagine the real and symbolic lives of animals, including a fox, a jaguar, and the eponymous hawk. Other poems focus on erotic relationships, and on stories of the First World War, Hughes's father being a survivor of Gallipoli.

The book, dedicated to Hughes' first wife Sylvia Plath, is a collection of 40 poems. According to the Oxford Dictionary of National Biography, Plath considered her husband's poetry ".. the most rich and powerful since that of Yeats and Dylan Thomas". She had typed out almost all his poems and submitted them, in this collection, to a competition for a first book of poems being run by the Poetry Centre of the Young Men's and Young Women's Hebrew Association of New York. In February 1957 the judges, W. H. Auden, Stephen Spender, and Marianne Moore, awarded the first prize (publication by Harper and Row) to Hughes. Marianne Moore wrote: "Hughes's talent is unmistakable, the work has focus, is aglow with feeling, with conscience; sensibility is awake, embodied in appropriate diction." Hughes rejected the Latinate and courtly iamb in favour of bludgeoning trochees and spondees. The strong alliteration, onomatopoeia, and hyperbole gave his poems an impact not heard in English verse since the demise of Middle English.

Contents 
 
 
 The Hawk in the Rain 
 The Jaguar 
 Macaw and Little Miss 
 The Thought-Fox 
 The Horses 
 Famous Poet 
 Song 
 Parlour-Piece
 Secretary 
 Soliloquy of a Misanthrope 
 The Dove-Breeder 
 Billet-Doux 
 A Modest Proposal 
 Incompatibilities 
 September 
 Fallgrief's Girl-Friends 
 Two Phases 
 The Decay of Vanity 
 Fair Choice 
 The Conversion of the Reverend Skinner 
 Complaint 
 Phaetons 
 Egg-Head 
 The Man Seeking Experience Enquire His Way of a Drop of Water 
 Meeting 
 Wind 
 October Dawn 
 Roarers in a Ring 
 Vampire 
 Childbirth 
 The Hag 
 Law in the Country of the Cats 
 Invitation to the Dance 
 The Casualty 
 Bayonet Charge 
 Griefs for Dead Soldiers 
 Six Young Men 
 Two Wise Generals 
 The Ancient Heroes and the Bomber Pilot 
 The Martyrdom of Bishop Farrar

References

English poetry collections
1957 poetry books
Poetry by Ted Hughes
Faber and Faber books